Ketan Desai may refer to:

 Ketan Desai (urologist), former president of Medical Council of India and President Elect (2016) of the World Medical Association 
 Ketan Desai (director), Hindi film director, son of Manmohan Desai
Ketan Desai is the mother of Indian Bollywood actor Jugal Hansraj